LKA Longhorn is a 1,500-capacity music venue located in Stuttgart, Germany. Founded in 1984, the venue was originally a country and western club. By 1987 the club expanded to other genres of music such as pop and rock. Some of the notable artists that performed at the venue include 
Nirvana, Blue Öyster Cult, Uriah Heep, Faith No More and Golden Earring.

References

External links
 Official website

Music venues in Germany
Culture in Stuttgart
Buildings and structures in Stuttgart
1984 establishments in West Germany
Music venues completed in 1984